The Empire of Japan competed at the 1928 Summer Olympics in Amsterdam, Netherlands.

Background
The Japan Amateur Athletic Federation (Nihon Rikujo Kyogi Renmei), founded in 1925, officially took over sponsorship of the Japanese Olympic team from the Japan Amateur Athletic Association in 1928. Japanese government sponsorship of the Olympic effort continued, both financially, and through expansion of the annual Meiji Shrine Games to include a wider variety of sports, including archery, basketball, field hockey, rowing, table tennis,  volleyball and equestrian sports.

The games became the qualifying event for the Japanese Olympic team, which now for the first time included a woman (Kinue Hitomi). For the 1928 Olympics, Japan fielded 43 athletes.

Medalists

|width=78% align=left valign=top|

| width=22% align=left valign=top |

Athletics

Ranks given are within the heat.

Field events

Combined events – Decathlon

Women
Track & road events

Boxing

Diving

Equestrian

Dressage

Eventing

Show jumping

Rowing

Men

Swimming

Wrestling

Men's Freestyle

References
Official Olympic Reports
International Olympic Committee results database

Nations at the 1928 Summer Olympics
1928
Summer Olympics